"My Doorbell" is a song by American alternative rock band the White Stripes, released as the second single from their album, Get Behind Me Satan (2005), on July 11, 2005. The song garnered the White Stripes a 2006 Grammy nomination for Best Pop Performance by a Duo or Group with Vocals. The video for this single was directed by the Malloys, filmed in black-and-white, and features Jack and Meg performing in front of a crowd of children; it was filmed at The Magic Castle in Hollywood, California.

Track listings

Australian and New Zealand CD single
 "My Doorbell"
 "Same Boy You've Always Known" (live)
 "Screwdriver" (live)

UK CD single
 "My Doorbell"
 "Screwdriver" (live)

UK 7-inch single
A. "My Doorbell"
B. "Same Boy You've Always Known" (live)

UK 12-inch single
A. "My Doorbell"
B. "Blue Orchid" (High Contrast remix)

Charts

Weekly charts

Year-end charts

Release history

References

 White Stripes.net Retrieved September 9, 2005

2005 singles
Black-and-white music videos
Music videos directed by The Malloys
Songs written by Jack White
V2 Records singles
The White Stripes songs
XL Recordings singles